The T3 tanker, or T3, are a class of seaworthy large tanker ships produced in the United States and used to transport fuel oil, gasoline or diesel before and during World War II, the Korean War and the Vietnam War. The T3 tanker classification is still used today. The T3 tanker has a full load displacement of about 24,830 tons.

Design
The T3 tanker is larger, and usually faster, than a T2 tanker. The hull designation AOG is used by the US Navy to denote that the ship is a T3 gasoline tanker. The AO designation denotes that the ship is a T3 fleet oiler, also referred to as a replenishment oiler (AOR).

Most of the T3 ships were built for private companies and named by the manufacturer. Some T3 tankers were built for or sold to the US Navy, which were renamed after Native Americans, rivers and lakes. 
T3 tankers are operated by the US Navy, War Shipping Administration and United States Maritime Commission.

Some T3 tankers were used to transport other goods like black oil-crude oil and chemicals. T3s are also called liquid cargo carriers. The T3 tanker has a full load displacement of about 24,830 tons.

Each T3 has emergency life rafts on the boat deck. The ships have cargo booms and piping to load and unload fuel. During wartime, the T3 ships were armed for protection with deck guns, mainly for anti-aircraft purposes. A typical ship may have one single /50 caliber dual-purpose gun, two  guns and three single  cannons. T3 ships normally carry 81 to 304 crew members. If operating as a United States Merchant Marine ship, the crew would be a mix of civilian Merchant Marines and US Navy Armed Guards to man the deck guns.

The World War II T3-class tankers were considered large for their day, but are small compared to modern oil tankers. Among "supertankers", the ultra large crude carrier is over 300,000 metric tons and the very large crude carrier is over 200,000 metric tons.

The attack on Pearl Harbor brought up an urgent need for aircraft carriers. This led to some T3 tankers being converted to escort carriers.  is an example of a T3 tanker, hull AO-33, that was rebuilt to be an escort carrier. The T3 tanker's size and speed made it a useful escort carrier.

Designs

Built by Bethlehem Steel in Sparrows Point, Maryland. (1939 design was a MC-N). 
 T3-S2-A1 tanker: A total of 17 were completed by: Bethlehem Steel Company, Sparrows Point, Maryland; Federal SB & DD Co. of Kearny, New Jersey; Newport News SB & DD Co. of Newport News, Virginia; and Sun SB & DD Co. of Chester, Pennsylvania. Armaments for AO-22 through 33 consisted of: 4 × 5-inch/38 caliber guns, 4 × twin 40 mm gun mounts and 4 × twin 20 mm gun mounts. AO-51 and later were armed with: 1 × 5-inch/38 caliber gun, 4 × 3-inch/50 caliber guns, 4 × twin 40 mm gun mounts and 4 × twin 20 mm gun mounts.
Jumboized Cimarron-class oilers were reclassed as Ashtabula-class oilers. Crew: 304 (US Navy) or 108 (civilians and US Navy guards). Armament: 1 × 5-inch/38-caliber gun, 4 × 3-inch/50-caliber guns, 4 × twin 40 mm antiaircraft guns and 4 × twin 20 mm antiaircraft guns. Built by Sun Shipbuilding & Drydock Co.
 T3-S-AZ1 tanker: Only one in class: , built by Sun Ship, launched in August 1943.
 T3-S-B tanker:  Crew: 50 and 31 US Navy Armed Guards. Armament: 1 × 5-inch (130 mm) gun, 1 × 3-inch (76 mm) gun and 20 mm guns, commissioned 1943. Two sub classes: T3-S-BF1 and T3-S-BZ1:
 T3-S-BF1 Five built in 1943 and 1944: first in class , Bulklube, Bulkfuel, Bulkcrude and Bulkero by Welding Shipyards Inc. in Norfolk, Virginia.
 T3-S-BZ1 Completed three ships: SS Phoenix, SS Nashbulk and SS Amtank. Built in 1943 and 1944 by  Welding Shipyards Inc. in Norfolk, Virginia.

Notable incidents
 USS Pan Pennsylvania, a Type T3-S-BF1 tanker, on 16 April 1944 was sunk off Nantucket by a torpedo from U-boat  commanded by Klaus Hänert. She had a crew of 50 men and 31 members of the Naval Armed Guard. The 28 merchant ships of CU-21 were accompanied by Escort Flotilla 21.5, which consisted of six destroyer escorts.
 , a T3-S2-A1 tanker, on 20 November 1944 was sunk near Ulithi Island after being hit by a Japanese Kaiten manned torpedo.
 USS Shabonee, a T3-S-A1 tanker, was sold to the US Navy and renamed USS Escalante (AO-70). In 1947 she was sold and renamed SS George MacDonald.
 Lake Charles, a T3-S-A1 renamed Capri, ran aground on Molasses Reef, Florida (25.07 N, 80.22 W) on 27 April 1963. She was a total loss.
 Brandywine, a T2-SE-A1 renamed Atlantic Sun, was damaged in 1962 and scrapped.
 Phoenix, a T3-S-BZ1, first in her class, was badly damaged in a collision with Pan Mass on 6 June 1953, resulting in a total loss.

See also
 T1 tanker the smallest in the T class
 T2 tanker the middle-sized and most-produced T class
 History of the oil tanker
 Victory ships
 Liberty ship
 Type C1 ship
 Type C2 ship
 Type C3 ship
United States Merchant Marine Academy
United States Navy oiler
List of auxiliaries of the United States Navy

References 

hazegray.org, Ships of Mare Island

External links 
 U.S. Navy Auxiliary Ship Images, AO, AR, AS & AV
 Waccamaw AO-109
 Waccamaw – AO 109

Type T3 tankers
United States Merchant Marine
World War II merchant ships of the United States
Ship types
World War II tankers of the United States